José Miguel Cubero Loría (born 14 February 1987) is a Costa Rican footballer who plays for Liga Deportiva Alajuelense and for the Costa Rica national football team as a holding midfielder.

Club career
Cubero was born in Sarchí. He made his professional debut for Herediano on 26 March 2006 against Santacruceña and had a spell on loan at Puntarenas in 2009. He signed a three-year contract extension with Herediano in April 2013.

On 31 July 2014, Cubero signed for Championship side Blackpool on a one-year contract with the option of a further twelve months. He made his Blackpool debut on 27 September in a 3–1 home defeat to Norwich City. In August 2015 it was claimed that Blackpool had snubbed an offer for Cubero from MLS club Seattle Sounders and that they had activated a 12-month extension to his contract.

On 31 July 2017, he signed a contract with CD Alcoyano.

International career
He participated in the 2007 FIFA U-20 World Cup held in Canada.

Cubero made his senior debut for Costa Rica in an August 2010 friendly match against Paraguay. He has represented his country in 9 FIFA World Cup qualification matches and played at the 2014 FIFA World Cup, the 2011 Copa Centroamericana as well as at the 2011 Copa América and was a non-playing squad member at the 2011 CONCACAF Gold Cup.

Cubero played 53 matches with Costa Rica, scoring two goals. One of those occurred during a 2014 FIFA World Cup qualification match against El Salvador, which resulted in a crucial victory for the Costa Ricans; Cubero considers it the most important goal of his career.

After Costa Rica defeated Greece to advance to the 2014 FIFA World Cup quarter-finals, Cubero was spotted crying profusely, while Waylon Francis tried to celebrate with him by yelling "¡Llore conmigo, papi!" ("Cry with me, daddy!"), a phrase now famous in Costa Rica.

Honours

Club
Alajuelense
Liga FPD: Apertura 2020
CONCACAF League:  2020

References

External links
 
 
 Profile - Herediano
 
 
 

1987 births
Living people
People from Sarchí (canton)
Association football midfielders
Costa Rican footballers
Costa Rica international footballers
Costa Rican people of Italian descent
2011 Copa Centroamericana players
2011 CONCACAF Gold Cup players
2011 Copa América players
2014 FIFA World Cup players
2014 Copa Centroamericana players
2015 CONCACAF Gold Cup players
C.S. Herediano footballers
Blackpool F.C. players
Puntarenas F.C. players
L.D. Alajuelense footballers
CD Alcoyano footballers
Copa Centroamericana-winning players
Costa Rica under-20 international footballers